Skimmia japonica, the Japanese skimmia, is a species of flowering plant in the family Rutaceae, native to Japan, China, and Southeast Asia. It is widely cultivated as an ornamental plant in gardens and parks. Its fragrant flowers are cream-yellow or white, followed on female plants by small, round, red fruits. The plant tolerates a wide range of conditions, including frost, drought, and atmospheric pollution. It is suitable for bonsai and for Chinese gardens.

Many cultivars have been developed for ornamental garden use, including varieties which are significantly more compact than their parents. These cultivars have gained the Royal Horticultural Society's Award of Garden Merit:- 

'Fragrans'
'Nymans'
'Rubella'
Skimmia × confusa 'Kew Green'

References

External links
 Skimmia japonica info

japonica